Mait Malmsten (born 6 September 1972 in Viljandi) is an Estonian actor.

Malmsten comes from a family of actors. His father is actor Rein Malmsten. His paternal grandparents were actors Franz Malmsten and Eva Meil. His great-uncle was actor Hugo Malmsten and his great-aunt was actress Lydia Bock.

In 1994 he graduated from the Estonian Academy of Music and Theatre.

Since 1993 he is working as an actor in Estonian Drama Theatre. Besides theatrical appearances he is also played in numerous films and television series, e.g. Wikmani poisid. He is married to actress Harriet Toompere and the couple have two sons, Franz and Hugo, who are also both television and film actors.

Selected filmography

Agent Wild Duck (Estonian: Agent Sinikael) (2002) 
Lotte from Gadgetville (Estonian: Leiutajateküla Lotte) (2006)
186 Kilometres (Estonian: Jan Uuspõld läheb Tartusse) (2007)
December Heat (Estonian: Detsembrikuumus) (2008)
Lotte and the Moonstone Secret (Estonian: Lotte ja kuukivi saladus) (2011)
Kertu (2013)
1944 (2015)
Seneca's Day (Lithuanian: Senekos diena) (2016) 
Class Reunion (Estonian: Klassikokkutulek) (2016)
Take It or Leave It (Estonian: Võta või jäta) (2018)
Lotte and the Lost Dragons (Estonian: Lotte ja kadunud lohed) (2019)
Melchior the Apothecary (Estonian: Apteeker Melchior) (2022)

References

External links

Living people
1972 births
Estonian male stage actors
Estonian male film actors
Estonian male television actors
Estonian male voice actors
20th-century Estonian male actors
21st-century Estonian male actors
Estonian Academy of Music and Theatre alumni
People from Viljandi